Trafigura Group Pte. Ltd. is a Singaporean-based French multinational commodity trading company founded in 1993 that trades in base metals and energy. It is the world's largest private metals trader and second-largest oil trader having built or purchased stakes in pipelines, mines, smelters, ports and storage terminals. The company operates through a complex network of over 100 subsidiaries across the world, with main operating offices in Geneva and Singapore.

Trafigura was formed by Claude Dauphin and Eric de Turckheim in 1993, but quickly split off from a group of companies managed by Marc Rich.

Trafigura has been named or involved in several scandals, particularly the 2006 Ivory Coast toxic waste dump, which left up to 100,000 people with skin rashes, headaches and respiratory problems. The company was also involved in the Iraq Oil-for-Food Scandal.

History 

Trafigura Beheer BV was established as a private group of companies in 1993 by six founding partners: Claude Dauphin, Eric de Turckheim, Graham Sharp, Antonio Cometti, Daniel Posen and Mark Crandall.

Initially focused on three regional markets – South America (oil and minerals), Eastern Europe (metals) and Africa (oil) – Trafigura has since diversified and expanded globally.

In November 2013 it was announced that Tory peer and former leader of the House of Lords Baron Strathclyde, Thomas Galbraith would be joining Trafigura as a non-executive director. He had previously stood down from the board of the group’s hedge fund arm following the 2009 controversy over the Côte d'Ivoire incident.

Executive chairman Claude Dauphin and the last remaining founder in an executive position, owned less than 20 per cent of the group’s equity at his death in September 2015, while more than 700 senior managers control the rest.

Investments 

In 2003 the group established its fund management subsidiary, Galena Asset Management. In 2010, Trafigura bought 8% of Norilsk Nickel.

In 2008 the Norwegian Broadcasting Corporation published the 50 min documentary "Dirty Cargo" disclosing what had happened in the small community prior to the explosion. The company Vest Tank was trying to neutralize the same kind of chemical waste that was dumped in Côte d'Ivoire when the explosion occurred. The owner of the waste was Trafigura, on whose behalf Vest Tank was working. Even so, Norwegian authorities did not prosecute Trafigura and the company was not accused of direct responsibility in the Vest Tank incident. Requests by Norwegian police to interview Trafigura employees were not granted by the company.

In February 2013 Trafigura invested $800 million in the Australian energy market, acquiring more than 250 petrol stations, two oil import terminals and five fuel depots in three separate acquisitions by its subsidiary Puma Energy. At the time, there was interest in Australia among energy traders due to a combination of rising demand and the closure of outdated, high-cost refineries. The same month, Trafigura joint venture DT Group partnered with Angola’s state oil firm Sonangol to form a new company, Sonaci DT Pte Ltd, to market Angola’s new liquefied natural gas (LNG) exports.

In March 2013, Trafigura announced a deal with South Sudan to export Dar Blend crude oil from Port Sudan. The agreement with South Sudan was a continuation of Trafigura's longtime presence in the Sudanese oil market and followed the resolution of a legal dispute between Sudan and South Sudan over transit fees and oil revenues.

In October 2013 Trafigura secured USD 1.5 billion in financing for an upfront loan to Russian oil producer OAO Rosneft. The prepayment facility, which provided a loan for advance payment for more than 10 million tons of products over five years, was the largest such deal ever completed by Trafigura.

A month later Trafigura signed an agreement with Dallas-based pipeline operator Energy Transfer Partners to transport crude oil and condensate via a partially converted 82-mile pipeline from the Eagle Ford oil field in McMullen County, Texas, to Trafigura’s deep-water terminal at Corpus Christi Bay, near the Gulf of Mexico.

In February 2014 Trafigura signed an agreement to acquire a 30% equity stake in the Jinchuan Group's newly established 400,000 tonnes-per-year copper smelter in Fangchengang, China.

In July 2014 Trafigura launched Lykos, an online platform in India to sell metals to small and medium-sized manufacturers in the country.

In September 2014 Trafigura completed the $860 million sale of an 80% stake in a Corpus Christi Texas oil storage terminal to Buckeye Partners LP.

In June 2015 Trafigura announced a 50:50 joint venture with Abu Dhabi investment company Mubadala Development Company—to invest in base metals mining. As part of the agreement Mubadala also acquired 50% of Trafigura's  (Matsa) mining operation, which owns three mines in southern Spain that produce copper, zinc and lead concentrate ores. This followed a doubling of processing capacity at the company's MATSA mining operation in Andalusia, Spain, where two new satellite mines are also being developed.

In August 2015 it was reported that Trafigura subsidiary Impala Terminals is investing USD1 billion in Colombia to develop a new inland road, rail and river network connecting major coastal ports with Colombia's industrial heartland. The Magdalena River, which runs between Barrancabermeja inland and Barranquilla on the Atlantic coast, will allow transportation of crude oil and petroleum products, dry bulk, containerised and general cargo to and from inland Colombia.

In October 2016 it was announced that Trafigura and Russian investment group United Capital Partners would each take a 24 per cent stake in Essar Oil, which owns India’s second-biggest private refinery in the western state of Gujarat as well as a network of 2,700 filling stations.

Trafigura was criticised in December 2022 for handing out "more than $1.7bn (£1.4bn) to its top traders and shareholders after the energy crisis, fuelled by the war in Ukraine".

On January 11, 2023, the company sold its 24.5% stake in the Indian company Nayara Energy, which was a joint venture with Rosneft. The share was bought by Hara Capital Sarl, a subsidiary of Mareterra Group Holding.

Bond issuances and reported earnings 
In 2008, the company had equity of more than $2 billion and a turnover of $73 billion that generated $440 million of profit.

In March 2010 Trafigura made its first venture into capital markets, issuing Euro 400m ($539m) in five-year Eurobonds.

The following month Trafigura listed its first perpetual subordinated bond on the Singapore Exchange (SGX) at a fixed rate of 7.625%. The issuance raised $500m in long-term capital that is treated as equity by international accounting rules, leaving existing shareholders undiluted.

By 2011, its revenue had increased to $121.5 billion and its profits to $1.11 billion, with profits falling 11% in 2012.

In 2013 as a consequence of the Singapore listing, Trafigura released financial statements for the first time, reporting Q1 profits of $216.1 million – up 3.2 per cent on the previous year. Revenue grew 7.9 per cent to USD 31.2 billion.

In March 2016, Trafigura closed a 46 million yen ($413 million) three-year loan, doubling the size of its 2014 Samurai loan.

Activities
Trafigura operates 65 offices in 36 countries.

Trafigura is the third-largest physical commodities trading group in the world behind Vitol and Glencore. Trafigura sources, stores, blends and transports raw materials including oil, refined petroleum products and non-ferrous metals (iron ore and coal).

Trade in non-ferrous and bulk commodities – mainly copper, lead and zinc concentrate, alumina, refined metals of copper, lead, zinc and aluminium as well as the iron ore and coal trading books – made up 13% of Trafigura’s overall trading turnover in 2016. The group traded 8.2 million tonnes of non-ferrous metal concentrates and 6.6 million tonnes of non-ferrous refined metal during the year. Overall volume across metals and minerals increased by 13% from 2015 to 59 million tonnes.

Trading volumes in oil and petroleum products totalled 4.3 million barrels a day in 2016, up 42% from 3 million barrels a day in 2015.

In October 2016 Trafigura sold five medium-range tankers to China’s Bank of Communications Financial Leasing Co, marking its exit from owning product tankers.

In support of its arbitrage-based business model, Trafigura ensures a degree of control over supply, storage and logistics through industrial subsidiaries: oil storage and distribution business Puma Energy, in which Trafigura holds a 49% interest.

Trafigura is involved in paper trading through its subsidiary Galena Asset Management, which was set up in 2003 to invest in commodity funds.

The company was named in the Iraq Oil-for-Food Scandal in connection with  a Liberian-registered turbine tanker, Essex, that had UN approval to load Iraqi crude at Iraq’s main export terminal at Mina al-Bakr. The tanker was chartered by Trafigura Beheer BV. According to her captain, Theofanis Chiladakis, the Essex was 'topped off' at least twice, with a total of 272,000 barrels of crude, after UN monitors had signed off the cargo.
This was on 13 May and 27 August 2001. Elf Aquitaine employees had first talked about this scheme in February 1998.

In February 2013, Trafigura Maritime Ventures Limited—the Malta based subsidiary of Trafigura Maritime Logistics PTE Limited based in Singapore—and the oil trading arm  of Total became involved in an oil price fixing controversy that led them to both be barred from the tendering process at the Enemalta oil purchasing board. Between 1999 and 2012, Enemalta paid the two companies $3.2 billion for oil, accounting for 70% of the oil purchased by Enemalta in that time period.

In May 2015, the Financial Times reported that Trafigura has become a major exporter for Rosneft crude oil from Russia despite sanctions. The company has seen a surge for such exports, almost 9 million barrels of crude in April 2015, mostly for Asian markets, financed by pre-pay oil deals in form of short term loans that are not subject to sanctions. While some commodity traders have been cautious dealing with sanctioned companies, Trafigura, which works with a number of global banks financing the oil deals, has found a reliable partner in Rosneft for global business.

In 2016, the Swiss non-governmental organisation Public Eye published the results of its investigation showing how traders –  especially Trafigura – prepare and sell "African quality" toxic fuel to Africa, containing high levels of sulphur that causes particulate matter pollution, damaging human health. Subsequently, Ghana reduced the maximum limit of sulphur in imported diesel fuel from 3000 to 50 parts per million, from March 2017 (the European limit is 10 parts per million). Trafigura stated that the report was "misconceived" as they only supply legal fuel  and that it is up to governments to set fuel specifications.

In November 2018 Global Witness asked the UK's Serious Fraud Office and the US authorities to investigate alleged ties between the Brazilian Operation Car Wash scandal and three oil trading companies, one of which was Trafigura. Trafigura is keeping the allegations "under review" and affirms that it "is taking the allegations ... seriously",  but has denied that its management knew that payments would be used to make improper payments to employees of Petrobras.

Some 18 months later, in May 2020, the Guardian reported Trafigura was under investigation by the US Commodity Futures Trading Commission (CFTC) for alleged corruption and market manipulation relating to oil trading. Subpoenas demand information going back at least four years relating to "manipulation and corruption involving oil products and trading". It was unclear if the CFTC investigation was related to Operation Car Wash.

Waste dumping in Ivory Coast

The 2006 Ivory Coast toxic waste dump was a health crisis in Ivory Coast in which the Probo Koala, a ship registered in Panama and chartered by Trafigura, hired a local contractor to offload waste in Abidjan after refusing to pay a €1,000 per cubic metre surcharge imposed by Amsterdam Port Services to discourage waste disposal in the Netherlands. The local contractor, Tommy, improperly dumped the waste materials at as many as 12 sites in and around the city of Abidjan in August 2006. The gas caused by the release of these chemicals is blamed by the UN and the government of Ivory Coast for the deaths of 17 and the injury of over 30,000 Ivorians, with injuries that ranged from mild headaches to severe burns of skin and lungs. Almost 100,000 Ivorians sought medical attention after prime minister Charles Konan Banny offered free medical care in Abidjan’s hospitals to the city’s residents.

Trafigura maintains that the substance dumped consisted of "slops", or waste water from washing the Probo Koala's tanks. An inquiry in the Netherlands, in late 2006, confirmed the substance to consist of more than 500 tonnes of a mix of fuel, hydrogen sulfide, and sodium hydroxide, known as caustic soda. After the start of the health crisis in Abidjan, the Probo Koala arrived at the port of Paldiski in Estonia where Trafigura permitted Dutch police onboard to conduct an investigation.

Trafigura denied any waste was transported from the Netherlands, saying that the substances contained only tiny amounts of hydrogen sulfide, and that the company did not know the substance was to be disposed of improperly. Trafigura officials, including Claude Dauphin and the company’s West Africa regional director, traveled to Abidjan to assist in the cleanup effort but were arrested and imprisoned by the Ivorian government. While its executives were being held, the company agreed to pay US$198 million for cleanup to the Ivorian government without admitting wrongdoing, and the Ivorian government pledged not to prosecute the company. Dauphin and his fellow executives were released following the settlement.

In 2008 a civil lawsuit in London was launched by almost 30,000 Ivorians against Trafigura. In May 2009 Trafigura announced it would sue the BBC for libel after its Newsnight program alleged the company had knowingly sought to cover up its role in the incident. In September 2009 The Guardian obtained and published internal Trafigura emails showing that the traders responsible knew how dangerous the chemicals were. Shortly afterwards Trafigura agreed to a settlement of £30 million (US$42.4 million) to settle the suit. In 2010 a Dutch court found Trafigura guilty of illegally exporting toxic waste from Amsterdam.

Corporate structure
Some of Trafigura's major international units include:

 Trafigura Beheer BV, based in the Netherlands. In 1999 it became the first company to obtain a contract to sell Sudan's oil internationally.
 Impala Group of Companies, which operate the group’s worldwide oil storage and distribution assets and investments has been a wholly owned subsidiary since 2001. 
 Puma Energy, which operates in more than 20 countries, mainly in Central America and Africa, and supplies a network of just over 600 service stations. On 7 May 2012, Puma entered into an agreement to buy out the key shareholders in KenolKobil, the largest independent oil marketing company in east and central Africa, which could add 400 stations to its network. However, Puma Energy later terminated its bid to acquire the oil marketer.
 EMINCAR, based in Havana until 2010. Dedicated to consulting and mineral logistics administration.
 Galena Asset Management, based in Switzerland, is the subsidiary through which Trafigura has established and manages a fund management business. Lord Strathclyde, the leader of the Conservative Party in the House of Lords, is a non-executive director on the board.

References

Literature

External links

 
 
 Trafigura press releases regarding the Côte d'Ivoire waste dumping incident
 NRK Brennpunkt Trafigura and the Minton report
 Leigh, David. "The Trafigura files and how to read them". The Guardian, 16 September 2009. This introduces: Internal Trafigura emails and letters regarding the Côte d'Ivoire waste dumping incident (PDF file, 7.9 MiB). The Guardian.
 Minton Report and related documents, WikiLeaks

Oil and gas companies of Singapore
Oil and gas companies of Switzerland
Oil companies of the Netherlands
Oil traders
Swiss companies established in 1993
Non-renewable resource companies established in 1993
Singaporean companies established in 1993
Multinational companies headquartered in Singapore